Daniel Liston (1900–1986) was an Irish member of the Congregation of the Holy Spirit, who served a Bishop of Port Louis in Mauritius from 1949 until 1968.

Born on 14 April 1900 in Foynes, Co. Limerick, Liston attend Blackrock College in Dublin for his secondary schooling. 

He trained for the Spiritans in Blackrock College, Rockwell College, and at Holy Ghost College, Kimmage Manor, while studying for his BA degree at University College Dublin. He studied in Rome at the Pontifical Gregorian University gaining a BCL and Doctorate of Divinity and was ordained in 1928.

He was appointed rector of Quatre-Bornes Seminary College, Mauritius in 1937. Liston was ordained a co-adjutor Bishop of Port Louis in 1947 to fellow Limerickman Bishop James Leen, succeeding as Bishop in 1949, serving in Port Louis until 1968. Retiring to England where he served as a chaplain.

Moving back to Kimmage Manor in 1983, he died on 3 May 1996 and was buried in the Holy Ghost plot in Kimmage.

Reference

1900 births
20th-century Roman Catholic bishops in Mauritius
Roman Catholic bishops of Port-Louis
Holy Ghost Fathers
Irish Spiritans
1986 deaths
Alumni of University College Dublin
Pontifical Gregorian University alumni
Clergy from County Limerick